The Elegy for Brahms is a short symphonic movement for orchestra, written by Hubert Parry in 1897.  It was written shortly after the death of Johannes Brahms, whom Parry considered the greatest artist of the time.

The Elegy is in the key of A minor, and is marked Maestoso espressivo - Largamente - Tempo primo.  The work quotes Brahms's music in several places.

The work was not performed in Parry's lifetime.  Following his own death in October 1918, it was performed at a memorial concert for him at the Royal College of Music on 8 November 1918, conducted by Sir Charles Villiers Stanford, who had slightly revised the work.

It did not receive its second performance until 1977.

It has received recordings conducted by Sir Adrian Boult and Matthias Bamert.

References
Notes

Sources
 

Compositions by Hubert Parry
1897 compositions
Compositions for symphony orchestra
Compositions in A minor
Funerary and memorial compositions
Parry